Mahmoud Riad (January 8, 1917 – January 25, 1992) was an Egyptian diplomat.  He was Egyptian ambassador to United Nations from 1962 to 1964, Egyptian Minister of Foreign Affairs from 1964 to 1972, and Secretary-General of the League of Arab States from 1972 to 1979.

An army officer turned diplomat, Riad was considered an expert on Arab affairs. After fighting in the 1948 Arab–Israeli War, he was a member of the Egyptian delegation that signed the 1949 armistice with Israel.

Following nine years of service in the army, Riad joined the Ministry of Foreign Affairs in 1952 and quickly climbed through the diplomatic ranks. He became Ambassador to Syria in 1955 and Permanent Representative to the United Nations in 1962. He served as Minister of Foreign Affairs from 1964 to 1972. In 1967, Riad worked with his colleague and friend, Ambassador Charles W. Yost, in an effort to find a solution before the outbreak of war.

He was elected Secretary General of the League of Arab States in 1972, succeeding Abdul Khalek Hassouna, also an Egyptian.

Riad relinquished the League of Arab States post in 1979 at the height of a crisis caused by Egypt's signing a peace treaty with Israel. Most Arab countries broke relations with Egypt over the treaty, and league headquarters were moved from Cairo to Tunisia. The headquarters returned to Egypt in 1990 after treaty opponents reconciled with Cairo and resumed diplomatic ties.

He is the author of three books. His most prominent book titled "The Struggle for Peace in the Middle East" was translated to English and published in London, England 1982.

Honour

Foreign honour
 Malaysia: 
 Honorary Commander of the Order of the Defender of the Realm (PMN (K)) - Tan Sri (1965)

Notes and references

1917 births
1992 deaths
Egyptian diplomats
Ambassadors of Egypt to Syria
Permanent Representatives of Egypt to the United Nations
Foreign ministers of Egypt
Secretaries General of the Arab League
Honorary Commanders of the Order of the Defender of the Realm